Rausch is the sixth studio album by Wolfgang Voigt's Gas project. The album was released on 18 May 2018. The album consists of one piece of music that is indexed solely for navigational purposes, and is designed to be listened to in one sitting. Both vinyl and CD pressings contain the full piece.

Track listing

Vinyl pressing

CD pressing

References

2018 albums
Gas (musician) albums
Kompakt albums